Barbara Paulus was the defending champion but did not compete that year.

Ruxandra Dragomir won in the final 7–6, 6–4 against Tamarine Tanasugarn.

Seeds
A champion seed is indicated in bold text while text in italics indicates the round in which that seed was eliminated.

  Ruxandra Dragomir (champion)
  Shi-Ting Wang (second round)
  Florencia Labat (quarterfinals)
  Henrieta Nagyová (semifinals)
  Nana Miyagi (second round)
  Nancy Feber (first round)
  Janette Husárová (quarterfinals)
  Sung-Hee Park (second round)

Draw

External links
 1996 Volvo Women's Open Draw

Singles
Volvo Women's Open - Singles
 in women's tennis